Leptothrix cholodnii is a bacterium from the genus Leptothrix, which has the ability to oxidize  Fe(II).

References

Burkholderiales
Bacteria described in 1963